Upper Pinelands is a rural locality in the Toowoomba Region, Queensland, Australia.

History 
Pinelands Upper State School opened circa 1922 and closed on circa 1946. It was at 57 Roberts Road (corner of Butters Lane).

Education 
Thee are no schools in Pinelands. The nearest government primary schools are Haden State School in Haden to the west and Crows Nest State School in Crows Nest to the east. The nearest government secondary schools are Crows Nest State School (to Year 10) and Highfields State Secondary College (to Year 12) in Highfields, Toowoomba, to the south.

References 

Toowoomba Region
Localities in Queensland